Indian National Congress is a political party in India.

Indian National Congress may also refer to:
Indian National Congress (Jagjivan), 1981–1986, led by Jagjivan Ram
Indian National Congress (Organisation) or Syndicate/Old Congress, 1969–1977, led by K. Kamaraj
Indian National Congress (R) or New Congress, 1969–1970s, led by Indira Gandhi
Indian National Congress (Sheik Hassan), formed 2002, led by Sheikh Hassan Haroon
Indian National Congress (U) or Indian Congress (Socialist), 1978–1986, led by D. Devaraj Urs